Since November 2002, rockets from the Delta 4 Medium family have been launched 29 times, all of which were successful. Its last flight was with a 3rd generation GPS satellite in August 2019.

About the Delta 4 Medium 
The Delta 4 Medium (also referred to as 'single stick') was available in four configurations: Medium, Medium+ (4,2), Medium+ (5,2), and Medium+ (5,4).

The Delta 4 Medium (Delta 9040) was the most basic Delta IV. It featured a single CBC and a modified Delta 3 second stage, with 4-meter liquid hydrogen and liquid oxygen tanks (called a Delta Cryogenic Second Stage (DCSS)) and a 4-meter payload fairing. The Delta 4 Medium was capable of launching 4,200 kg to geostationary transfer orbit (GTO). From Cape Canaveral, GTO is 1804 m/s away from GEO. The mass of fairing and payload attach fittings have been subtracted from the gross performance.

The Delta 4 Medium+ (4,2) (Delta 9240) had the same CBC and DCSS as the Medium, but with the addition of two Orbital ATK-built 1.5-m (60-in) diameter solid rocket booster Graphite-Epoxy Motors (GEM-60s) strap-on boosters to increase payload capacity to 6,150 kg to GTO.

The Delta 4 Medium+ (5,2) (Delta 9250) was similar to the Medium+ (4,2), but had a 5-m–diameter DCSS and payload fairing for larger payloads. Because of the extra weight of the larger payload fairing and second stage, the Medium+ (5,2) could launch 5,072 kg to GTO.

The Delta 4 Medium+ (5,4) (Delta 9450) was similar to the Medium+ (5,2), but used four GEM-60s instead of two, enabling it to lift 6,882 kg to GTO.

To encapsulate the satellite payload, a variety of different payload fairings were available. A stretched Delta III 4-meter diameter composite payload fairing was used on 4-meter Medium versions, while an enlarged, 5-meter diameter composite fairing was used on 5-meter Medium versions.

The Medium (4,2) version last flew on 22 August 2019, marking the retirement of the Delta 4 Medium variants.

Launch Statistics

Rocket configurations

Launch Outcomes

Launch sites

Orbits

Customers

Launch History

See also 

 Delta 4 Heavy
 Delta 4 Medium
 Delta 4
 Delta rocket family
 List of Thor and Delta launches
 List of 2000-2009 Thor and Delta launches
 List of 2010-2019 Thor and Delta launches
 List of Delta 4 Heavy launches

References 

Lists of Delta launches
United Launch Alliance
Lists of rocket launches